Iffeldorf station, formerly known as Staltach, is a railway station in the municipality of Iffeldorf, in Bavaria, Germany. It is located on the Kochelsee line of Deutsche Bahn.

Services
 the following services stop at Iffeldorf:

References

External links
 
 Iffeldorf layout 
 

Railway stations in Bavaria
Buildings and structures in Weilheim-Schongau